Trevor Lennen (born June 5, 1983) is a Belizean professional footballer who currently plays for Police United and the Belize national football team as a midfielder.

International goals
Scores and results list Belize's goal tally first.

External links
 Career summary at FIFA.com

1983 births
Living people
Belize international footballers
Belizean footballers
Premier League of Belize players
2005 UNCAF Nations Cup players
2007 UNCAF Nations Cup players
2013 Copa Centroamericana players
2013 CONCACAF Gold Cup players
2014 Copa Centroamericana players
2017 Copa Centroamericana players
Association football midfielders
Police United FC (Belize) players
Verdes FC players
Belize Defence Force FC players